The Ussuri black bear (Ursus thibetanus ussuricus), also known as the Manchurian black bear, is a large subspecies of the Asian black bear native to the Far East, including the Korean Peninsula.

Etymology 

The subspecies is named after the Ussuri River.

Ecology 
Sympatric predators include the Ussuri brown bear and Siberian tiger.

References 

Asiatic black bears
Mammals of Korea
Mammals of Russia
Subspecies
Taxa named by Pierre Marie Heude